Zamia hymenophyllidia is a species of plant in the family Zamiaceae. It is found in Colombia (Amazonas Department) and Peru (Loreto Region). In Peru, it is found in Maynas, Pebas, and Brilla Nueva. It is threatened by habitat loss.

References

hymenophyllidia
Critically endangered plants
Taxonomy articles created by Polbot